Barry Woodland is a British former Grand Prix motorcycle road racer.

Woodland won the "Grovewood Award" in 1976. The award was given by the motoring press to the rider showing most promise as best young rider of the year.

In 1977 he was sponsored by Mitsui UK, the British Yamaha Importers, on both 250cc and 350cc machines. He competed in Europe, North and South America up until 1985. 

Woodland won the  Production D class at the Isle of Man TT three times in a row (1986, 1987, and 1988). His most commonly used bike was the Loctite Yamaha. 

Woodland retired from motor bike racing in 1991.

References

External links
Competitor profile - Official Isle of Man TT website
Memorable Isle of Man TT Races
Speed at the TT Races

Living people
British motorcycle racers
English motorcycle racers
Isle of Man TT riders
350cc World Championship riders
250cc World Championship riders
Grovewood Award winners
1947 births